Boston Metropolitan Airport was an airfield in Canton, Massachusetts, on the northeast side of Neponset St just southeast of the Neponset River. In the 1930s it had four gravel runways. The May 1956 sectional chart shows one 2100-ft turf runway; the airport isn't on the December 1956 chart.

References

Defunct airports in Massachusetts
Airports in Norfolk County, Massachusetts
Canton, Massachusetts